Matthew or Matt Higgins may refer to:

 Matt Higgins (businessman), president and CEO of RSE Ventures
Matt Higgins, a character in the film Angel on My Shoulder
 Matt Higgins (ice hockey) (born 1977), Canadian ice hockey centre 
 Matthew James Higgins (1810–1868), British writer
 Matthew Higgins (cyclist) in Node 4-Giordana Racing